Ilia Iljiushenok is a Russian chess grandmaster.

Chess career
He has represented his country in the 2010 Chess Olympiad, and played in the Chess World Cup 2015, being defeated by Dmitry Jakovenko in the first round.

References

External links 

Ilia Iljiushenok chess games at 365Chess.com

1993 births
Living people
Russian chess players
Chess grandmasters